Edward Joseph Cleary (July 17, 1866 – April 5, 1942) was an American politician in the state of Washington. He served in the Washington State Senate from 1915 to 1931. From 1925 to 1927, he was President pro tempore of the Senate.

References

Republican Party Washington (state) state senators
1866 births
1942 deaths
People from Briggsville, Wisconsin